Lake Sorell is a rural locality in the local government areas (LGA) of Central Highlands and Northern Midlands in the Central LGA region of Tasmania. The 2016 census recorded a population of nil for the state suburb of Lake Sorell.

History 
Lake Sorell is a confirmed locality.

Geography
About half of Lake Sorell (the body of water) is within the locality.

Road infrastructure 
Route C527 (Interlaken Road) passes to the south.

References

Towns in Tasmania
Localities of Central Highlands Council
Localities of Northern Midlands Council